The National Collegiate Wrestling Association (NCWA) is a nonprofit association of 162 institutions, conferences, organizations and individuals that organize the wrestling programs of many colleges and universities in the United States and Canada. It is led by founder and executive director Jim Giunta headquartered in Dallas, Texas and built to help the promotion of collegiate wrestling.

Many teams were formerly NCAA programs displaced by Title IX legislation and/or are preparing to join the NCAA, NAIA, or NJCAA. Teams in transition to a higher division not eligible for the NCAA postseason also compete in the NCWA. Notable wrestling programs to have started or competed in the NCWA and are now in other associations include: California Baptist, Lindenwood - St. Charles, McKendree, Notre Dame College, Queens, and Southern Illinois Edwardsville.

History 
A post-secondary athletic association built to help the promotion of collegiate wrestling, the NCWA was founded in 1997 as a 501c3 non-profit by the current executive director, Jim Giunta, after resigning as executive director of the Texas Interscholastic Wrestling Association (TIWA). At its founding the association had 13 member teams, but today the NCWA is composed of over 150 wrestling teams and clubs from across the United States and Canada. Many of these programs were formerly NCAA scholarship programs which were affected by Title IX legislation, which has resulted in many colleges being forced to give up their wrestling programs in the name of gender equality. The variety of institutions competing in the NCWA is wide and unrestricted as junior colleges, trade schools and post-secondary prep institutions compete in the same national championship as four-year colleges and universities.

NCWA Growth

Notable current teams 
While the NCWA currently has over 100 schools in competition, a few programs have distinguished themselves as top-tier programs.

Notable former teams 
While the NCWA currently has over 100 schools in competition, it has also been home to many programs that transitioned from one association to another or that originated as an NCWA program and later changed associations.

Advantages of the NCWA 
 The organization and its members encourage wrestlers to compete no matter what the experience level.
 A good format for the average wrestlers who still have the passion to compete in the sport they love.
 Several NCWA members have gone on to become scholarship athletes at NCAA and NAIA institutions.
 Several NCWA All-Americans have gone on to be NCAA All-Americans.
 Several NCWA coaches have gone on to be NCAA, NAIA, NJCAA coaches. 
 Gives smaller colleges and universities the opportunity to begin a collegiate-level program.
 Programs can be established and developed quickly without the traditional limitations of an NCAA team.
 Funding of teams is open to many sources not allowable under NCAA rule.
 Programs currently transitioning from one association to another (NCAA, NAIA, NJCAA, USCAA, NCCAA) have a place to compete in the post-season during their transitional period.
 The NCWA is always looking to implement new rules and functions of collegiate, such as instant replay for officials and the Collegiate Cup.
 The student-athletes are and have to be extremely hands-on in all of the team's operations and decision-making; this type of leadership training can prepare the student-athlete for their future careers whether in wrestling or not.
 The NCWA is a governing body of wrestling and can make their own decisions as far as rules, procedures, and competition. This is evident with advances such as the GoGreco Program, instant replay and challenges in matches, and the Collegiate Cup championship format.
 Talented high school student-athletes who were passed over by NCAA, NAIA, and NJCAA schools have a chance to compete at an NCWA program.
 Talented high school student-athletes who transferred out of an NCAA/NAIA/NJCAA school have a second chance to wrestle in college.
 Some U.S. states do not have NCAA, NAIA, and/or NJCAA teams with wrestling, but do have at least one NCWA wrestling program, which can make it easier for high school athletes to decide where they want to wrestle in college in terms of financial costs. 
 The NCWA allows student-athletes four total seasons of eligibility with no time frame to complete them unlike the NCAA, who requires student-athletes to complete four seasons of eligibility in five years of enrollment starting from the student's first year at the school, and the NJCAA, requires student-athletes to complete two seasons of eligibility in three years of enrollment starting from the student's first year at the school.

Similarities with NCAA, NAIA, NJCAA, CCCAA, and WCWA 
 Collegiate weight classes are used (125, 133, 141, 149, 157, 165, 174, 184, 197, 285 lbs).
 All meets and tournaments use NCAA rules and procedures.
 All conferences host a Conference Championships tournament with a specific allotment of automatic qualifiers based on placement finish in the Conference Championships.
 Like the NAIA, a school can enter two wrestlers in the same weight class at the Conference and National Championships (if they both qualify for the latter); one is deemed the scorer and the other the non-scorer (no advancement, match, or placement points are awarded to this wrestler).
 Like the NAIA, the NCWA allows a student-athlete four total seasons of eligibility regardless of time frame. The NCAA require students to complete their four seasons of eligibility in five years starting from the student's first year of competition (barring a sixth-year grant for hardship). Athletes previously competing for an NCAA, NJCAA, or CCCAA program that transfer to the NCWA will still have the remaining number of eligible seasons without the previous time frame. 
 Like the WCWA, schools traditionally competing in the NCAA, NAIA, NJCAA, or CCCAA can all compete against one another.

Differences with NCAA, NAIA, NJCAA, CCCAA, and WCWA 
As mentioned before, the NCWA allows many types of funding to its wrestling programs that might not be allowed by the NCAA. This can allow the wrestling team to grow at its own rate.

235 lb weight class 
The NCWA is the only association with collegiate wrestling to offer an 11th weight class: 235 lbs. There are a number of benefits from this: 
 This weight class bridges the weight gap between the 197 lb and 285 lb weight classes, the biggest weight disparity among any two weight classes. 
 College wrestlers who wrestled in the 195 or 220 lb weight classes in high school might find this easier to compete in than having to wrestle at 197 lbs or 285 lbs. 
 Schools who have two or more prominent athletes in the 197 and/or 285 lb weight classes can now give their athletes another chance to succeed individually and earn team points.
 Another weight class leads to higher team scores at tournaments.
 The 11th weight class can often be used as a tiebreaker as the first criterion of "Number of Matches Won" in dual meet settings.

Collegiate Cup Championship Series 
Starting in the 2013–2014 season, the National Championships in March and the Collegiate Cup Duals (previously known as the National Dual Meet Championship) directly related to each other in a team's point total. A team's finish at the Collegiate Cup Duals transferred to additional points being awarded at the National Championships.

The National Wrestling Coaches Association (or "NWCA") have a National Duals tournament for NCAA Division I, Division II, Division III, NAIA, NJCAA, and NCWA teams, but all do not tie into their respective National Championships point totals. Penn State University (NCAA D-I) won four straight National Championships from 2011 to 2014 – without ever competing in the NCAA D-I entry of the National Duals. The NCWA's National Championship Series is the first of any of the college divisions to have a true champion that is indicative of both its team's as well as its individuals' success.

GoGreco Program 
Starting in 2016, the NCWA launched the GoGreco Program with USA Wrestling. While USA Wrestling's Freestyle and Greco-Roman season and procedures are separate from the wrestling teams and individuals that participate in them, the NCWA owns and operates the GoGreco Program within their domain and directly controls and promotes another wrestling opportunity. This is the first collegiate-level Greco-Roman wrestling national championship. The inaugural championships will take place on June 3, 2017, in Dallas, Texas on the campus of Richland College.

The first tournament, the Texas GoGreco Championships, took place on Saturday, May 6, 2017, at Richland College. The University of North Texas won the tournament with six of seven wrestlers winning in the finals. Richland College and University of Houston–Downtown finished second and third, respectively.

Women's Folkstyle Wrestling 
Whereas the WCWA has athletes compete in freestyle, the NCWA has its women's division compete in collegiate folkstyle wrestling. There are a number of teams that compete in both the WCWA and NCWA to give their athletes more competitive opportunity.

National Events 
The NCWA sponsors nine types national events:
 The Champions Challenge
 The NCWA National Duals
 Regional Duals Championship
 Conference Championships
 Recruit Me High School Wrestling Combine
 National Collegiate Wrestling Championships
 The Women's Collegiate Wrestling Championships
 GoGreco National Championships
 The Vision Forum

Champions Challenge 
From 2010 to 2011, the Champions Challenge was formed by the NAIA and NCWA to bring more highlight matches to the wrestling community by pitting NAIA All-Stars against NCWA All-Stars at each weight class in a dual meet (except for 235 lbs since the NAIA does not recognize that weight class in competition). The All-Stars were usually the highest returning All-American at each weight class barring injury; the coaching staffs were one or two coaches for each school represented in the dual. The NCAA Division II is slated to join in the next event.

National Dual Meet Championship 
In 2008, the NCWA approved the National Dual Meet Championship where the top teams in the country would compete against one another to crown a true team champion starting in 2009. No other association had an official dual-based team champion at the time and that is still the case except in the NCWA. The current structure has 24 teams competing in a bracketed format down to 24 places.

In its thirteenth season, the NCWA hosted its first National Dual Meet Championship. Whereas the National Championships focuses more on individual success and teams can depend on one or a few exceptional wrestlers, the National Duals highlights teams with solid line-ups and good wrestlers at each weight class. It is common for teams that win or place highly in the National Duals to do so at the National Championships later. The National Duals usually take place in late January before the National Championships.

Starting in the 2013–2014 season, two changes took place: 1) the National Dual Meet Championship was now renamed as the Collegiate Cup Duals and 2) a team's finish at the Collegiate Cup Duals would earn it a certain number of team points at the National Championships and aid them in winning it. Two major reasons for this change were to 1) encourage more teams to want to wrestle in the Collegiate Cup Duals and, 2) while still recognizing up to two different champions at the two different tournaments, one team could be determined as the best true overall team and individual wrestling champion that year.

During the 2017 Vision Forum, the NCWA ruled that the National Dual Meet Championship will be held on the eastern side of the United States during even-numbered years and on the western side of the United States during odd-numbered years.

6:12 Project 
The 6:12 Project is a community outreach program created by the NCWA for its wrestlers, coaches, officials, volunteers, and staff to help the city hosting the NCWA National Duals. NCWA wrestling programs serve food to those in need and hold canned and non-perishable food drives. They later donate those goods, as well as clothes (especially jackets), to one of the city's organizations.

The name "6:12 Project" comes from the Biblical quote Ephesians chapter 6, verse 12 from the New Testament:
"For we do not wrestle against flesh and blood, but against principalities, against power, against the rulers of the darkness of this age, against spiritual hosts of wickedness in the heavenly places."

The first 6:12 Project took place at the 2012 National Duals in Dalton, Georgia and repeated for the 2013 and 2014 events which were also held in Dalton. It is scheduled to continue at the 2015 Collegiate Cup Duals in Dalton again.

NCWA Regional Duals Championship 
Initially created as the Western Regional Duals, this event was created in order to give teams in the western and central part of North America the opportunity to compete in a national dual meet event like the National Dual Meet Championship.

Historically, the National Dual Meet Championship has been hosted on the eastern side of the United States in Georgia, Tennessee, or Virginia. When the Collegiate Cup was passed in 2013, questions and concerns were raised as to whether teams closer to the physical location of the National Dual Meet Championship would have an unfair competitive advantage in terms of championship points calculated for the Collegiate Cup series.

At the 2017 Vision Forum, the NCWA passed a resolution stating that in even-numbered years the National Duals would take place on the eastern side and the Regional Duals on the western side; in odd-numbered years, the National Duals would take place at a western location and the Regional Duals an eastern location.

Conference Championships 
Following the inaugural season, the NCWA approved a five-conference format where wrestlers would compete for advancement into the National Championships as well as seeding if they qualified. The number of conferences has fluctuated throughout the years including reaching a record high of 9 and currently set at 8. Additionally, some conferences have been renamed over the years. These conferences are geographically-based and are similar to the National Championships tournament where Division I and II programs wrestle in one bracket, but differ in that team scores are kept as one tournament (unlike the National Championships having a Division I team score and Division II team score).

"Recruit Me" High School Wrestling Combine 
The day before competition starts at the National Championships, the NCWA hosts a wrestling combine for athletes to showcase their talents to observing college coaches. Most athletes are high school student-athletes which is the primary focus, however students at a post-secondary institution without a wrestling program may also attend. The event also allows students to ask questions about collegiate competition to college coaches.

Men's Collegiate Wrestling Championships 
The first major event the NCWA hosted took place in 1998 was the inaugural National Championships with 26 teams in one division in the 10 then-standard weight classes. Since then, the event has grown to include approximately 340 qualifiers among 150+ teams within the 11 NCWA weight classes where two champions are crowned (Division I and Division II).

Here, individuals are recognized for their outstanding individual achievement. They can earn team points (unless they are the non-scorer on their team) by advancing through the tournament, scoring bonus points in matches, and placing in the top 8. Teams accumulate points from all of their scoring wrestlers. The National Championships have traditionally been held in the middle of March. Division I and Division II teams compete in one bracketed tournament where the overall team points are separated at the end between the two.

In 1998, the NCWA approved an eleventh weight class, the 235 lb weight class.

In 2007, the NCWA approved All-American status for wrestlers placing in top 8. Previously, only the top 6 wrestlers in each weight class were named All-Americans.

In 2010, the NCWA approved a two-division classification system - the Division I level composed of established teams meeting specific criteria and the Division II tier where up-start teams as well as teams aiming to join Division I would compete.

Since the 2013–2014 season when the Collegiate Cup championship series was passed, teams' National Championships points are added with their National Dual Meet Championship finish points to determine the overall team champion.

In 2020, multiple teams and individual wrestlers withdrew from the tournament before or during the tournament due to the COVID-19 pandemic.

Women's Collegiate Wrestling Championships 
The first NCWA-sponsored Women's Collegiate Wrestling Championships took place at the 2008 National Championships. The NCWA sponsored this event under their new banner organization, the National Collegiate Women's Wrestling Association (NCWWA). The weight classes have been designed to closely resemble most female athletes' natural weight ranges as well as let programs that also compete in women's collegiate freestyle to acclimate to folkstyle competition. Whereas before matches were done using freestyle rules, as was the norm with associations like the WCWA, the NCWWA uses collegiate/folkstyle rules like in the NCWA, NCAA, NAIA, and NJCAA.

Team scores were unofficial at the inaugural 2008 tournament, and Simon Fraser University finished with the most team points. Bo Icalia and Josh White are tied for head coaches to have won the most titles; Icalia won the 2010 and 2011 titles as head coach of Yakima Valley Community College and the 2012 and 2013 titles as head coach of Southwestern Oregon Community College. White has won the 2014, 2015, 2016, and 2017 titles all with Southwestern Oregon Community College.

The top 3 wrestlers in each weight class are recognized as All-Americans. University of South Florida's Jasmine Grant is the NCWWA's first and only 4x All-American (2011–2014) so far. University of Maine's Samantha Frank has won 3 national titles going into the 2017–2018 season.

The Women's College Wrestling Championships has traditionally been dominated by northern and northwestern teams.

In 2020, multiple teams and individual wrestlers withdrew from the tournament before or after it had started in response to the COVID-19 pandemic.

GoGreco National Championships 
Approved in 2016, the GoGreco Program was launched with USA Wrestling in order to improve the U.S.A.'s performance in Junior- and Senior-level Greco-Roman competition. The GoGreco season starts on the last weekend of March and concludes with the GoGreco Collegiate National Championships on the first weekend of June.

GoGreco Nationals is an open-entry event to any NCWA Member institution. NCAA, NAIA & NJCAA institutions that are not currently a member of the NCWA are encouraged to join the NCWA for the GoGreco Season and to send athletes to the Nationals. Student-athletes must maintain the same academic standards that are required of the NCWA and their member institutions in order to compete.

The inaugural championships took place on June 3, 2017, in Dallas, Texas on the campus of Richland College.

Vision Forum 
Every year since 1997, the NCWA's Vision Forum convenes during the wrestling off-season in the summer and is held at about the same location as and set a few days before the National Wrestling Coaches Association Convention. The Vision Forum focuses on the NCWA rule changes, policies, and procedures from the previous season and if any modifications need to be made or new topics need to be discussed. The 2017 Vision Forum will be held from Wednesday, August 2 to Sunday, August 6 in Daytona Beach, Florida.

Some important changes and events that have come from the Vision Forum:
 Introduction of Puerto Rico programs, Puerto Rico Conference, and first National Championships held in Puerto Rico; passed in 2022
 NWCA National Dual Meet Championship to feature NCWA Division, NCWA to host both Eastern and Western Regional Dual Meet Championships; passed in 2022
 Women's division for the National Dual Meet Championship; passed in 2019
 National Duals and Regional Duals to switch between eastern- and western-based locations every year; passed in 2017
 Western Regional Duals; passed in 2016
 "Recruit Me" High School Wrestling Combine; passed in 2015
 Go Greco Initiative; passed in 2015
 Collegiate Cup National Championships Series; passed in 2013
 National Collegiate Grappling Association; passed in 2013
 Seven conferences re-aligned into nine conferences; passed in 2012
 Use of mat-side instant replay for officials; passed in 2011
 Two men's divisions - Division I and Division II; passed in 2010
 National Dual Meet Championship; passed in 2008
 Added women's division (National Collegiate Women's Wrestling Association); passed in 2007
 Addition of 7th and 8th-place finishes at National Championships into All-American finishes; passed in 2006
 First National Championships to take place outside of Texas; passed in 2001 
 Addition of an 11th weight class, the 235 lb weight class; passed in 1998

Team Championship History

Champions by year

Champions by team

Collegiate Cup Championship 
At the 2013 Vision Forum, the NCWA approved a new National Championships Series to crown a true National Team Champion. With the National Dual Meet Championship, the team that wins the Collegiate Cup will earn 24 team points. The runner-up will receive 23, third-place 22, and so forth until the 23rd-place team receives 2 points. All other teams that participated, but did not place in the top 23 will receive 1 point. Those points will be carried over to the individual-based National Championships where teams will continue to score points based on their individual athletes' performances.

The winner of the Collegiate Cup will have accrued the most total points between both events and be presented with the College Cup as the overall NCWA National Champions. Grand Canyon University was the first champion of the new format in 2014.

Structure 
The NCWA is divided into eight regional conferences and four divisions. Men's Division I programs are athletic department funded or have met the NCWA's D-I criteria. Many of the Division I programs also offer athletic scholarships.  Men's Division II teams are broken into categories; Emerging Programs, that are developing into Division I teams, and Clubs that operate on campuses where there are established NCAA/NCAA/NJCAA Teams; few Division II schools are of the latter circumstance. Schools whose wrestling teams are competing in the NCWA during their school's transitional period are placed into Division I. Women's programs are any collegiate/post-seconday scholastic programs who also compete in the collegiate folkstyle ruleset. GoGreco programs have most of the same set-up as the men's and women's divisions with the exception that it is under a Greco-Roman ruleset.

In August 2010, the current two-division system was passed at that year's Vision Forum and implemented for the 2011 National Championships.

Conferences

Former Conferences 

Wrestling clubs in the NCWA: Bloomsburg University, Edinboro University, Ferrum College, Fresno State University, Iowa State University, Lehigh University, Michigan State University, Northern Illinois University, Ohio State University, Pennsylvania State University, Rutgers University, Sacred Heart University, State University of New York - Cortland, University of Buffalo, University of Iowa, University of Maryland, University of Michigan, University of Northern Colorado, University of Pittsburgh, University of Wisconsin, Virginia Military Institute, Virginia Tech University.

Notable people 

The NCWA has had thousands of alumni since it began in 1997. Notable alumni include:

 Jeff Allen: First 4x National Champion in NCWA history (2019-2020, 2022-2023).
 Kevin Andres: Head coach of Ottawa - Arizona's men's and women's wrestling teams and current Sports Clubs Coordinator. Head coach of Belmont Abbey (1998-2006), Mercer (2006-2014) men's, and Ottawa (2015-2018) men's wrestling teams.
 Justin Bellman: First 2x National Champion (1998-1999) for Valley Forge Military, 1999 NCWA Most Outstanding Wrestler.
 Jadaen Bernstein: 4x NCAA Division I National Qualifier wrestler for United States Naval Academy. 2014 174 lb National Champion for Navy Prep.
 Asnage Castelly: 2016 Olympic freestyle wrestler for Haiti. Coaches at Springfield Tech.
 Jesse Castro: 4x NCCAA champion wrestler for Liberty and National Wrestling Hall of Fame - Virginia Chapter member. Current head coach of Liberty wrestling team. 
 Ryan Diehl: 2x NCAA Division I National Qualifier wrestler for Maryland. 2x NCWA National Champion for Liberty. 
 Tony Ferguson: MMA fighter signed with UFC, winner of The Ultimate Fighter 13. 2006 165 lb national champion and 2x All-American for Grand Valley State].
 LeRoy Gardner III: Head men's wrestling coach at University of the Ozarks and NCAA Division III champion for Wartburg. Former head wrestling coach at Houston - Downtown.
 Nicholas Gil: 2x NCAA Division I National Qualifier wrestler for United States Naval Academy. 2015 149 lb National Champion for Navy Prep.
 David Hazewinkel: Olympic Greco-Roman wrestler for the United States of America in 1968 and 1972, brother of James Hazewinkel, uncle of Sam Hazewinkel. Coached at Pensacola Christian (1998-2006) and Marion Military (2006-2016). 
 James Hazewinkel: Olympic Greco-Roman wrestler for the United States of America in 1968 and 1972, brother of Dave Hazewinkel, father of Sam Hazewinkel. Coached at Pensacola Christian (1998-2006) and Marion Military (2006-2016). 
 Tom Lawlor: MMA fighter signed with UFC. 3x national champion and 4x All-American for Central Florida. 
 Antonio Martinez: 3x Copa Sparta freestyle tournament champion, most recently at 70 kg in 2016. 2016 All-American for Texas - Austin.
 Santiago Martinez: 2015 NCAA Division I National Qualifier wrestler for Lehigh, 2x Pan-American freestyle medalist and World Championships 79 kg freestyle wrestler for Columbia at 79 kg. 2x 157 lb National Champion for Central Florida.
 Anthony McLaughlin: 2019 NCAA Division I National Qualifier wrestler for Air Force. 2015 184 lb National Champion for Air Force Prep.
 Frank Mensah: Canadian Olympic Trials runner-up and current Development Coach for the Women's Provincial Team and Head Coach/Program Director of Coast Wrestling Academy in the Lower Mainland. 2005 125 lb national champion and 2x All-American for Douglas. 
 Zach Merrill: 2017 University Nationals 98 kg Greco-Roman champion, 2018 World Championships 97 kg freestyle qualifier, and 2020 Pan-American Olympic Qualifier representative for Puerto Rico. 2x NCWA champion for California Baptist. 
 Andre Metzger: 2x NCAA Division I national champion for Oklahoma and 3x World Championship freestyle wrestling medalist for United States of America. Head coach of North Texas.
 Bill Neal: Former Greco-Roman wrestling coach for United States Olympic Training Center. Head wrestling coach at Richland.
 Ike Okoli: 2014 World Championships +90 kg bronze medalist in Beach Wrestling for United States of America, 2019 Turkmen Goresh bronze medalist at the World Nomad Games, and 2019 US Open 130 kg Greco-Roman placewinner.  2x NCWA All-American for South Carolina.
 Richard Robitaille: Veteran, author, and founder of Richard Robitaille, LLC. Coached at Valley Forge Military.
 Melvin Rubio: 2019 NCAA Division II National Qualifier wrestler for Queens. 2018 NCWA All-American at 125 lbs.
 Joe Scott: 2017 NCAA Division III National Qualifier wrestler for Washington & Lee. 2020 NCWA National CHampion for Liberty. 
 Bruce Shumaker: Edinboro wrestler who wrestled in two U.S. Open Trials. Head coach of Apprentice from 2008 to 2017.
 Geordan Speiller: 2018 World Championships 82 kg Greco-Roman wrestler for the United States of America. 2016 165 lb national champion for Central Florida.
 Cole VonOhlen: 4x NCAA Division I National Qualifier wrestler for United States Air Force Academy. 2009 141 lb National Champion for Air Force Prep.
 Bryant Wood: Model and actor. 2014 NCWA National runner-up for Grand Canyon. 
 Josh "The Goods" Woods: Amateur professional wrestler signed with Ring of Honor. 4x NCWA All-American and 2011 National Champion for Central Florida.

NCWA Gear 

NCWA Gear is the official apparel of the National Collegiate Wrestling Association. Based out of Orlando, Florida, the business sells sublimated athletic apparel designed for wrestling and mixed martial arts practice and competition for both men and women of all ages. NCWA Gear also offers full customization on its products.

In 2015, USA Wrestling named NCWA Gear's Florida National Team Uniforms for Fargo as the "Best Uniform Package." Mixed martial artists Josh "The Goods" Woods and Daniel "The Animal" Martinez both wore NCWA Gear while fighting.

See also
 NCWA women's wrestling champions

Notes

External links
 Men's Division - NCWA website
 Women's Division - NCWA website

College wrestling in the United States
College sports governing bodies in the United States